Douglas Graham Ashcraft (born February 11, 1998) is an American professional baseball pitcher for the Cincinnati Reds of Major League Baseball (MLB). He made his MLB debut in 2022.

Early life and amateur career
Ashcraft grew up in Gurley, Alabama, and attended Huntsville High School. He was selected in the 12th round of the 2016 Major League Baseball Draft by the Los Angeles Dodgers, but opted not to sign with the team.

Ashcraft enrolled at Mississippi State University and began his college baseball career with the Mississippi State Bulldogs. As a freshman he went 2–0 with a 5.63 ERA and 25 strikeouts in ten appearances. Following the season Ashcraft transferred to the University of Alabama at Birmingham (UAB) to play for the UAB Blazers. After sitting out one season due to NCAA transfer rules, Ashcraft went 2–5 with a 5.62 ERA and 56 strikeouts in 53 innings over 17 pitching appearances.

Professional career
The Cincinnati Reds selected Ashcraft in the sixth round of the 2019 Major League Baseball draft, making Ashcraft the highest-selected player in the MLB draft from UAB. After signing with Cincinnati, he was assigned to the Rookie-level Greeneville Reds. Ashcraft did not play in 2020 following the cancelation of the minor league season due to COVID-19. He was assigned to the High-A Dayton Dragons, where he went 4–1 with a 2.33 ERA and 55 strikeouts before being promoted to the Double-A Chattanooga Lookouts. Ashcraft began the 2022 season with the Triple-A Louisville Bats.

Ashcraft was promoted to the Reds' major league roster on May 20, 2022. He made his MLB debut on May 22, tossing 4.1 innings against the Toronto Blue Jays and allowing two earned runs. On May 23, he was removed from the 40-man roster and returned to Triple-A Louisville. On May 27, Ashcraft had his contract selected back to the active roster.

References

External links

Mississippi State Bulldogs bio
UAB Blazers bio

1998 births
Living people
Sportspeople from Huntsville, Alabama
Baseball players from Alabama
Major League Baseball pitchers
Cincinnati Reds players
UAB Blazers baseball players
Mississippi State Bulldogs baseball players
Greeneville Reds players
Dayton Dragons players
Chattanooga Lookouts players
Louisville Bats players